Gary Leonard Oldman (born 21 March 1958) is an English actor and filmmaker. Known for his versatility and intense acting style, he has received various accolades, including an Academy Award, a Golden Globe Award, and three British Academy Film Awards. His films have grossed over $11 billion worldwide, making him one of the highest-grossing actors of all time.

Oldman began acting in theatre in 1979 and made his film debut in Remembrance (1982). He continued to follow a stage career in London's Royal Court and was a member of the Royal Shakespeare Company, with credits including Cabaret, Romeo and Juliet, Entertaining Mr Sloane, Saved, The Country Wife and Hamlet. He rose to prominence in British film with his portrayals of Sid Vicious in Sid and Nancy (1986), Joe Orton in Prick Up Your Ears (1987) and Rosencrantz in Rosencrantz & Guildenstern Are Dead (1990), while also attracting attention as the leader of a gang of football hooligans in the television film The Firm (1989). Regarded as a member of the "Brit Pack", he achieved greater recognition as a New York gangster in State of Grace (1990), Lee Harvey Oswald in JFK (1991) and Count Dracula in Bram Stoker's Dracula (1992).

Oldman portrayed the villains in films such as True Romance (1993), The Fifth Element (1997), Air Force One (1997) and The Contender (2000); corrupt DEA agent Norman Stansfield, whom he played in Léon: The Professional (1994), was called one of cinema's best villains. He also played Ludwig van Beethoven in Immortal Beloved (1994) and later appeared in franchise roles such as Sirius Black in the Harry Potter series, James Gordon in The Dark Knight Trilogy (2005–2012) and a human leader, Dreyfus in Dawn of the Planet of the Apes (2014). He won the Academy Award for Best Actor for his role as Winston Churchill in Darkest Hour (2017), and was nominated for his portrayals of George Smiley in Tinker Tailor Soldier Spy (2011) and Herman J. Mankiewicz in Mank (2020).

Oldman was executive producer of films like The Contender, Plunkett & Macleane (1999) and Nil by Mouth (1997), the latter of which he also wrote and directed. He has featured in television shows such as Slow Horses, Fallen Angels, Tracey Takes On... and Friends, voiced Ignitius and Viktor Reznov respectively in The Legend of Spyro and Call of Duty video games, and appeared in music videos for David Bowie, Guns N' Roses and Annie Lennox.

Early life and education
Gary Leonard Oldman was born in New Cross, London, on 21 March 1958, the son of Leonard Bertram Oldman (1921–1985), a former sailor who also worked as a welder, and Kathleen (née Cheriton; 1919–2018). He said his father was an alcoholic who left the family when Oldman was seven years old. His older sister, Maureen, is an actress better known as Laila Morse; she performed in Oldman's directorial debut Nil by Mouth (1997), before taking on her most famous role of Mo Harris in the BBC soap opera EastEnders.

Oldman attended West Greenwich School in Deptford, leaving at the age of 16 to work in a sports shop. He played piano as a child, but he gave up his musical aspirations to pursue an acting career after seeing Malcolm McDowell's performance in the film The Raging Moon (1971). In a 1995 interview with Charlie Rose, he said, "Something about Malcolm just arrested me, and I connected, and I said, 'I wanna do that.'"

Growing up in south London, Oldman supported his local football club, Millwall F.C., but also followed Manchester United because he idolised George Best. In 2011, he learned from his mother that his father had played for Millwall just after World War II: "Just after the war, [my mother] ran a boarding house for football playersMillwall players. And I knew that my dad was involved somehow with the reserve team. But two weeks ago my mum said, 'Oh yeah, your dad played for Millwall. When he was young he had a couple of first team games.'"

Oldman studied with the Young People's Theatre in Greenwich during the mid-1970s, while working jobs on assembly lines, as a porter in an operating theatre, selling shoes and beheading pigs in an abattoir. He applied unsuccessfully to the Royal Academy of Dramatic Art (RADA), which welcomed him to try again the following year, but advised him to find something else to do for a living. When asked by Charlie Rose if he had reminded RADA of this, Oldman joked that "the work speaks for itself".

He won a scholarship to attend the Rose Bruford College in Sidcup, south-east London, from which he graduated with a BA in Acting in 1979. Oldman described himself as a "shy" but diligent worker during his time there, performing roles such as Puck in Shakespeare's A Midsummer Night's Dream.

Career

Late 1970s–1980s
After leaving drama school, Oldman was the first in his year to receive professional work; he stated that this was not a result of being the most talented actor, but rather diligence and application. In 1979, he starred in Thark, opposite Annette Kerr, at York's Theatre Royal. Subsequent plays included Cabaret, Privates on Parade and Romeo and Juliet. In December 1979, Oldman appeared as Puss in Dick Whittington and His Cat, staged at York. He also acted in Colchester, then with Glasgow's Citizens Theatre; Oldman's work ethic and trademark intensity would make him a favourite with audiences in Glasgow during the 1980s. He also toured Europe and South America with the Citizens Theatre company.

From 1980 to 1981, Oldman appeared in The Massacre at Paris (Christopher Marlowe), Desperado Corner (Shaun Lawton) and Robert David MacDonald's plays Chinchilla and A Waste of Time. He performed in a 6-month West End run of MacDonald's Summit Conference, opposite Glenda Jackson, in 1982. Also that year, Oldman made his film debut in Colin Gregg's Remembrance, and would have starred in Don Boyd's Gossip if that film had not collapsed. The following year, he landed a starring role as a skinhead in Mike Leigh's film Meantime, and moved on to Chesterfield to assume the lead role in Entertaining Mr Sloane (Joe Orton). He then went to Westcliffe to star in Saved (Edward Bond).

Saved proved to be a major breakthrough for Oldman. Max Stafford-Clark, artistic director of the Royal Court Theatre, had seen Oldman's performance and cast him as Scopey, the lead role of Bond's The Pope's Wedding, in 1984. For his acclaimed performance, he won two of British theatre's top honours: the Time Out Fringe Award for Best Newcomer, and the Drama Theatre Award for Best Actor—the latter of which was shared with future film co-star Anthony Hopkins for his performance in Pravda. Oldman's turn in The Pope's Wedding led to a run of work with the Royal Court, and from 1984 to 1986 he appeared in Rat in the Skull (Ron Hutchinson), The Desert Air (Nicholas Wright), Cain and Abel, The Danton Affair (Pam Gems), Women Beware Women (Thomas Middleton), Real Dreams (Trevor Griffiths) and all three of Bond's The War Plays: Red Black and Ignorant, The Tin Can People and Great Peace. Oldman was a member of the Royal Shakespeare Company from 1985 to 1986.

The 1984 production of The Pope's Wedding had been seen by director Alex Cox, who offered Oldman the part of musician Sid Vicious in the 1986 film Sid and Nancy. He twice turned down the role before accepting it, because, in his own words: "I wasn't really that interested in Sid Vicious and the punk movement. I'd never followed it. It wasn't something that interested me. The script I felt was banal and 'who cares' and 'why bother' and all of that. And I was a little bit sort-of with my nose in the air and sort-of thinking 'well the theatre—so much more superior' and all of that." He reconsidered based on the salary and the urging of his agent. In 1987, Oldman gained his third starring film role as Joe Orton in Prick Up Your Ears, for which he received a BAFTA nomination for Best Actor. That same year, he appeared in the plays The Country Wife (William Wycherley) and Serious Money (Caryl Churchill). Film director Luc Besson told how, on the set of The Fifth Element (1997), Oldman could recite any scene from Hamlet (William Shakespeare), in which he had starred a decade earlier.

Oldman's performances in Sid and Nancy and Prick Up Your Ears paved the way for work in Hollywood, garnering acclaim from United States film critic Roger Ebert. Ebert wrote, "There is no point of similarity between the two performances; like a few gifted actors, [Oldman] is able to re-invent himself for every role. On the basis of these two movies, he is the best young British actor around." Vicious's former Sex Pistols bandmate, John Lydon, despite criticising Sid and Nancy, described Oldman as a "bloody good actor". The performance would go on to be ranked No. 62 in Premiere magazine's "100 Greatest Performances of All Time" and No. 8 in Uncut magazine's "10 Best actors in rockin' roles", the latter describing Oldman's portrayal as a "hugely sympathetic reading of the punk figurehead as a lost and bewildered manchild."

In late 1988, he starred opposite "hero" Alan Bates in We Think the World of You, and in 1989 alongside Dennis Hopper and Frances McDormand in the Chattahoochee. Also in 1989, Oldman also starred as football hooligan Clive "Bex" Bissel in controversial British television drama The Firm, giving a performance that Total Film numbered as his best and called "stunning" and "fearless" in 2011. Oldman and other young British actors of the 1980s who were becoming established Hollywood film actors, such as Tim Roth, Bruce Payne, Colin Firth, Daniel Day-Lewis and Paul McGann, were dubbed the "Brit Pack", of which Oldman was de facto leader.

1990s
In 1990, Oldman costarred with Tim Roth in Rosencrantz & Guildenstern Are Dead, Tom Stoppard's film adaptation of his own play of the same name. Total Film praised the movie, calling Oldman's character "a blitz of brilliant comedy timing and pitch perfect line delivery." He then starred opposite Sean Penn and Ed Harris in State of Grace (1990); Roger Ebert described Oldman's turn as the highlight, and Janet Maslin referred to his work as "phenomenal". He was offered, but turned down, the lead role in that year's Edward Scissorhands. Oldman moved to the United States in the early 1990s, where he has resided since.

In 1991, he began filming Dylan Thomas, a biopic on Welsh poet Dylan Thomas, with his then-wife Uma Thurman as Caitlin Thomas; production shut down shortly after filming began. Later in 1991, Oldman starred in his first US blockbuster, playing Lee Harvey Oswald in Oliver Stone's JFK. According to Oldman, very little was written about Oswald in the script. Stone gave him several plane tickets, a list of contacts and told him to do his own research. Oldman met with Oswald's wife, Marina, and her two daughters to prepare for the role. He filmed scenes for the 1992 neo-noir thriller Final Analysis, which were cut.

In 1992, he starred as Count Dracula in Francis Ford Coppola's romance-horror Bram Stoker's Dracula. A commercially successful film adaptation of Bram Stoker's 1897 novel, it was a box office success worldwide. Oldman's performance was recognised as the best male performance of 1992 by the Academy of Science Fiction, Fantasy & Horror Films, which awarded Oldman its Best Actor award. He served as a member of the Jury at the 1993 Cannes Film Festival. Oldman became a popular portrayer of villains: he played violent pimp Drexl Spivey in the Tony Scott-directed, Quentin Tarantino-written True Romance (1993), a role which MSN Movies described as "one of cinema's most memorable villains"; a sadistic prison warden in Murder in the First (1995); futuristic corporate tyrant Jean-Baptiste Emanuel Zorg in The Fifth Element (1997); and Dr. Zachary Smith/Spider Smith in the commercially successful but critically panned Lost in Space (1998). He was considered for two roles in Quentin Tarantino's Pulp Fiction (1994), but neither were realised. Tarantino contemplated Oldman as gangster Jules Winnfield (played by Samuel L. Jackson), while TriStar executives recommended him for drug dealer Lance (portrayed by Eric Stoltz).

In 1994's Léon: The Professional, he played corrupt DEA officer Norman Stansfield, which has since been named by multiple publications as one of the best villains, and most corrupt cops, in cinema. Oldman also portrayed various accents; along with the Transylvanian Count Dracula, he gave a critically acclaimed reading of German-born Viennese composer Ludwig van Beethoven in Immortal Beloved, and played Russian terrorist Egor Korshunov in the 1997 blockbuster Air Force One. In 1998, MTV's Celebrity Deathmatch aired a match between claymation representations of Oldman and Christopher Walken to determine the greatest cinematic villain. The following year, Oldman served as executive producer of Plunkett & Macleane, and portrayed another historical figure, Pontius Pilate, in television film Jesus. He was also considered for the role of Morpheus in The Matrix.

2000s 

Oldman appeared opposite Jeff Bridges as zealous Republican congressman Sheldon Runyon in The Contender (2000), of which he was also executive producer. Oldman received a Screen Actors Guild Award nomination for his performance, although some claimed he was dissatisfied with DreamWorks' supposed editing of the film to reflect pro-Democratic leanings. These reports were declared "sloppy sensationalism" by his manager, Douglas Urbanski, who said that Oldman was "the least political person I know". He stressed that neither he nor Oldman had made the statements attributed to them, that they had "produced this film, every last cut and frame", and that DreamWorks "did not influence the final cut or have anything to do with it." Urbanski asserted that Oldman received "creepy phone calls advising him that he was ruining his chances of an Oscar nomination". The notion of Oldman criticising DreamWorks was dispelled as a "myth" by critic Roger Ebert.

In 2001, he starred opposite Anthony Hopkins in Hannibal, as Mason Verger, the only surviving victim of Hannibal Lecter. He spent six hours per day in the make-up room to achieve the character's hideously disfigured appearance, and went uncredited in the film. It marked the second time that Oldman had appeared opposite Hopkins, who was part of the supporting cast of Bram Stoker's Dracula. He received an Emmy Award nomination for two guest appearances in Friends in May 2001, appearing in the two-part episode "The One With Chandler and Monica's Wedding" as Richard Crosby, a pedantic actor who insists that "real" actors spit on one another when they enunciate, leading to tension, then friendship, with Joey Tribbiani (Matt LeBlanc). Oldman had previously worked with LeBlanc on Lost in Space.

Following his Friends appearance, Oldman did not appear in any major roles until 2004; it was suggested that he was blacklisted in Hollywood during this time, following the controversy that had surrounded the release of The Contender. In 2002, he starred in the generally well-received Interstate 60, and played the Devil in the BMW short film, The Hire: Beat the Devil. Guardian writer Xan Brooks described the early 2000s as Oldman's "low point", recalling "barrel-scraping roles" in the 2003 films Tiptoes and Sin. Although the film failed to impress reviewers, Oldman did garner some praise for his portrayal of a man with dwarfism in Tiptoes: Lisa Nesselson in Variety described his work as "astonishingly fine", and the performance was later mentioned in Mark Kermode's "Great Acting in Bad Films".

In 2004, Oldman returned to prominence when he landed a starring role in the Harry Potter film series, playing Harry Potter's godfather Sirius Black. The following year, he starred as James Gordon in Christopher Nolan's commercially and critically successful Batman Begins, a role that he reprised in the even more successful sequel The Dark Knight (2008) and once more in the conclusion, The Dark Knight Rises (2012). Film critic Mark Kermode, in reviewing The Dark Knight, downplayed claims that Heath Ledger's Joker was the highlight of the film, saying, "the best performance in the film, by a mile, is [by] Gary Oldman... it would be lovely to see him get a nomination because actually, he's the guy who gets kind of overlooked in all of this." Oldman co-starred with Jim Carrey in the 2009 version of A Christmas Carol in which Oldman played three roles. He had a starring role in David Goyer's supernatural thriller The Unborn, released in 2009.

2010s 

In 2010, Oldman co-starred with Denzel Washington in The Book of Eli. He also played a lead role in Catherine Hardwicke's Red Riding Hood. Oldman voiced the role of villain Lord Shen and was nominated for an Annie Award for his performance in Kung Fu Panda 2.

Oldman received strong reviews and earned his first Academy Award nomination and a BAFTA Award nomination for his portrayal of British spy George Smiley in Tinker Tailor Soldier Spy (2011), an adaptation of the John le Carré novel, directed by Tomas Alfredson. To prepare for the role of George Smiley, Oldman gained 15 pounds, watched Alec Guinness' performance in Tinker Tailor Soldier Spy, and paid a visit to Smiley's creator John le Carré to perfect the character's voice. In 2012, Oldman played Floyd Banner, a big-hitting mobster, in John Hillcoat's Lawless, alongside Tom Hardy, Shia LaBeouf, Guy Pearce and Jessica Chastain. The following year, he portrayed Nicholas Wyatt, a ruthless CEO, in Robert Luketic's Paranoia, along with Harrison Ford and Liam Hemsworth. In 2014, Oldman starred alongside Joel Kinnaman, Abbie Cornish, Michael Keaton and Samuel L. Jackson in the remake of RoboCop, as Norton, the scientist who creates the title character.

Also that year, Oldman starred in Dawn of the Planet of the Apes as one of the leads alongside Jason Clarke and Keri Russell. In a promotional interview published in the July/August issue of Playboy magazine, Oldman slammed what he saw as excessive political correctness in American media, alleged discriminating hypocrisy by entertainers who hide "behind comedy and satire to say things we can't ordinarily say", and downplayed the convictions behind offensive slurs said by actors Alec Baldwin and Mel Gibson, attributing their statements to anger and inebriation, respectively. He went on to say that Gibson—who had faced censure for antisemitic remarks—had "bitten the hand that [feeds]", being in "a town that's run by Jews" (referring to Hollywood). Oldman stressed that he is not "a fascist or a racist", but was nevertheless criticised for his comments. He issued multiple apologies, including on 25 June edition of late-night talk show, Jimmy Kimmel Live!, where he described the remarks as "offensive, insensitive, pernicious and ill-informed". Both the Anti-Defamation League and the Simon Wiesenthal Center welcomed Oldman's contrition (the latter inviting him to its Museum of Tolerance to screen 2017's Darkest Hour). Director David Fincher told Playboy, "I know him very well... Gary's not cruel. He's an incredibly thoughtful guy."

In 2015, Oldman played the head of police that investigates Tom Hardy's character in Child 44, alongside Noomi Rapace and Joel Kinnaman, and had a supporting role in the post-apocalyptic American thriller Man Down, directed by Dito Montiel, and starring alongside Shia LaBeouf and Kate Mara. In 2016, Oldman played a CIA chief in Criminal, directed by Ariel Vromen, and starring Kevin Costner, Tommy Lee Jones, Ryan Reynolds, Alice Eve, and Gal Gadot.

In 2017, Oldman played three film roles: a billionaire entrepreneur in The Space Between Us, a dictatorial President in The Hitman's Bodyguard, and former British Prime Minister Winston Churchill in Joe Wright's war drama Darkest Hour—his portrayal of Churchill garnered critical acclaim. Oldman's transformation into the wartime Prime Minister took 200 hours in the makeup chair, 14 pounds of silicone rubber, and $20,000 worth of Cuban cigars, which gave him nicotine poisoning. In 2018, he won the Academy Award for Best Actor, Golden Globe Award for Best Actor – Motion Picture Drama, Critics' Choice Movie Award for Best Actor, Screen Actors Guild Award for Best Actor, and BAFTA Award for Best Actor in a Leading Role. His Golden Globe win came despite Oldman having once been a critic of that award; he noted that he was "amazed, flattered and very proud" to be nominated.

In 2018, in his first post-Oscar role, Oldman voiced an evil artificial intelligence in Netflix's independent film Tau and starred in Hunter Killer alongside Gerard Butler. In 2019, Oldman starred in horror-thriller Mary, directed by Michael Goi, and the thriller The Courier, opposite Olga Kurylenko, and appeared in Steven Soderbergh's The Laundromat as Jürgen Mossack, opposite Meryl Streep and Antonio Banderas.

2020s 
In 2020, Oldman starred as Citizen Kane co-writer Herman J. Mankiewicz in David Fincher's biographical drama black-and-white Netflix movie Mank, which follows Mankiewicz's tumultuous development of the script for Citizen Kane alongside director Orson Welles. The film co-stars Amanda Seyfried, Lily Collins, and Charles Dance. Mank had a limited theatrical release on 13 November, and began streaming on Netflix on 4 December. It received positive reviews, earning 88% on Rotten Tomatoes with the critics consensus being, "Sharply written and brilliantly performed, Mank peers behind the scenes of Citizen Kane to tell an old Hollywood story that could end up being a classic in its own right." In 2021, Oldman starred opposite Armie Hammer in Crisis and in Joe Wright's The Woman in the Window, alongside Amy Adams.

He has been set to play a hitman alongside Dylan O'Brien in The Bayou. Oldman is also slated to direct a biopic about Eadweard Muybridge entitled Flying Horse.

In 2022, Oldman starred as a cantankerous manager of intelligence agents in the Apple TV+ spy drama television series Slow Horses, based on the book of the same name. Slow Horses marked the first time Oldman played a lead role in a television series. On November 20, 2022, he stated that the series would likely be his last role as he intended to retire from acting once the series ended.

Other work

Filmmaking
In 1997, Oldman directed, produced, and wrote the award-winning Nil by Mouth, a film partially based on his own childhood. Nil by Mouth went on to win the BAFTA Alexander Korda Award for Best British Film (shared with Douglas Urbanski and Luc Besson) and also the BAFTA Award for Best Screenplay, the Channel 4 Director's Award, and an Empire Award. In 1999, it was adjudged by the British Academy of Film and Television Arts as one of the hundred best British films of the 20th century. Nil By Mouth was listed by Time Out as number twenty-one of the top 100 best British films ever.

Oldman and producing partner Douglas Urbanski formed the SE8 GROUP to produce Nil by Mouth. The company also produced The Contender, which also starred Oldman. He completed a screenplay, Chang & Eng, co-written with Darin Strauss, based on the author's book of the same name. In September 2006, Nokia Nseries Studio released the Oldman-directed short film Donut, with music by Tor Hyams. The film was shot with an N93 to promote the phone. Juliet Landau made a 25-minute documentary about the making of the video. In 2011, he directed a music video for then-wife Alex Eden's first single, "Kiss Me Like the Woman You Loved".

Music
Oldman has had a keen interest in music from an early age. He is a proficient pianist and stated in a 1995 interview with Charlie Rose that he would rather be a musician than an actor. Oldman sang several tracks on the Sid and Nancy soundtrack, on which he performed alongside original Sex Pistols bassist Glen Matlock, and sang and played live piano in the 1988 movie Track 29. He traced over Beethoven compositions in 1994's Immortal Beloved, and tutored Harry Potter actor Daniel Radcliffe on bass guitar. Oldman appeared on Reeves Gabrels' album The Sacred Squall of Now, performing a vocal duet with David Bowie on the track "You've Been Around". He produced a live performance by former White Stripes member Jack White in conjunction with Vevo and YouTube. At the 2016 Brit Awards in London, Oldman paid tribute to Bowie, before receiving the Brits "Icon Award" on behalf of the singer and his family.

Voice acting
Oldman participated in the creation of The Legend of Spyro games, produced by Sierra Entertainment. He provided the voice of the Fire Guardian, Ignitus. He voices Sergeant Viktor Reznov and scientist Daniel Clarke in the Call of Duty games. He also provides the narration of Sergeant Jack Barnes in the Spearhead expansion for Medal of Honor: Allied Assault. In 2015 he voiced Lord Vortech, the evil mastermind who seeks to control the LEGO Multiverse, in the Lego Dimensions video game. He will play Admiral Ernst Bishop in the upcoming single-player campaign of the Chris Roberts-designed crowdfunded video game, Squadron 42.

Writing
In 2015, Oldman and his manager Douglas Urbanski signed a deal with the Simon & Schuster/Atria Publishing label Emily Bestler Books for Blood Riders, a vampire book series.

Acting style
Oldman studied the teachings of Konstantin Stanislavski and Stella Adler while at drama school but went "off-book", drawing much of his inspiration from American cinema. As a screen actor, Oldman was almost typecast as an anti-social personality early in his career. The necessity to express villainous characters in an overtly physical manner led to the cultivation of a "big" acting style that incorporated projection skills acquired during his stage training. He further sought to develop a distinctive approach that would distance him from his "stuffy" and "often interchangeable" British peers.

Oldman has conceded that his performances often involve an element of overacting: "It's my influence on those roles that probably [makes them] feel bigger than life and a little over-the-top. I mean, I do go for it a bit as an actor, I must admit." In another interview, he stated, "If it's coming from a sincere place, then I think the screen can hold the epic and it can hold the very, very small." Stuart Heritage of The Guardian wrote, "Finding the definitive Gary Oldman ham performance is like trying to choose which of your children you prefer. The man is a long-term devotee of the art of ham." Conversely, Oldman noted that he enjoys "playing characters where the silence is loud" such as George Smiley in Tinker Tailor Soldier Spy (2011).

Oldman has adopted various accents for roles and portrayed a wide range of characters. He is known for his in-depth research of his roles, as well as his devotion to them, at one point being hospitalized after losing significant weight for Sid and Nancy, and another time had to hire a dialect coach to relearn his English accent after nearly adopting an "American twang" due to his children being raised American. In a 2017 interview, he differentiated between immersion and impression:

Reception and legacy

Oldman has established a cult following among film fans. He is known for playing the primary antagonist in a number of popular motion pictures, which has seen him referenced in popular culture. At the peak of his popularity in the 1990s, Oldman was dubbed by Empire magazine Hollywood's "psycho deluxe", and was spoofed on popular television shows such as Fox comedy series In Living Color and MTV's Celebrity Deathmatch, as well as drafted in to appear on the first ever cover of Loaded magazine. In 1993, he appeared in the music video for Annie Lennox's international hit "Love Song for a Vampire", written for the soundtrack to Bram Stoker's Dracula, and had a cameo role as the Devil in the video for Guns N' Roses single "Since I Don't Have You"—Oldman also played the Devil in the 2002 BMW short Beat The Devil, alongside Clive Owen, James Brown and Marilyn Manson. He starred as a sleazy priest in the controversial religious-themed video for David Bowie's 2013 single "The Next Day". In contrast to his often dark on-screen roles, Oldman's affable real-life demeanour has been noted, and he was named as one of Empires "100 Sexiest Stars in Film History" in 2007. In 2011, Empire readers voted him the recipient of the Empire Icon Award, which was presented by Colin Firth.

Washington Post and Independent writers noted that Oldman is regarded as one of the greatest actors of his generation. In 2012, Globe and Mail journalist Lynn Crosbie wrote, "Critics never fail to single Oldman out... he is one of a few truly great living actors—arguably, even, the best." Of his diversity, Yahoo! Movies noted that he had "gained a well-earned reputation as a brilliant chameleon"; the Houston Chronicle dubbed Oldman "the face of versatility". He is noted for his avoidance of the Hollywood celebrity scene, often being referred to as an "actor's actor". His work has been acclaimed by Hollywood figures: Tom Hardy has described Oldman as his "absolute complete and utter hero" and "hands down, the greatest actor that's ever lived"; Brad Pitt, Daniel Radcliffe and Ryan Gosling have also cited Oldman as their favourite actor. Hardy recalled Oldman's influence on students at drama school, stating that "everybody used to quote him in all of his films". Jessica Chastain, Jennifer Lawrence, Joseph Gordon-Levitt, Tom Hiddleston and Chris Pine have also named Oldman as one of their favourite actors.

Other actors such as Christian Bale, Hugh Jackman, Benedict Cumberbatch, Shia LaBeouf, Ben Mendelsohn, Johnny Depp, Jason Isaacs, and Michael Fassbender have cited Oldman as an influence; Bale called him "the reason I'm acting". Anthony Hopkins, Ralph Fiennes, Keanu Reeves and Ray Winstone have used the term "genius" in reference to Oldman. John Hurt called him "the best of the bunch"; Colin Firth hailed him as "a very strong candidate for the world's best living actor" and a "hero" of his; and Alec Baldwin described him as "preternaturally gifted" and "the greatest film actor of his generation". Kristin Scott Thomas referred to Oldman as "the most amazing, generous actor". Christopher Eccleston hailed Oldman's Academy Award win for Darkest Hour as "massive" to people from working-class backgrounds. He remarked, "Oldman is as fine an actor as Daniel Day-Lewis, but Gary is not double-barrelled." Collaborating directors Luc Besson, Tony Scott and Christopher Nolan have lauded his work; Besson in 1997 called him "one of the top five actors in the world", while Scott labelled him a "genius". David Cronenberg said that Oldman "really is a fabulous actor" who gave "the best version" of James Gordon (in Nolan's Dark Knight trilogy).

Film critics have also been vocal in their appreciation of Oldman. Roger Ebert hailed him as "one of the great actors, able to play high, low, crass, noble"; while Gene Siskel called him "wonderful" and one of his favourite actors. Peter Travers described Oldman as "one of the best actors on the planet". Prior to his first Academy Award nomination for Tinker Tailor Soldier Spy, Oldman was regarded as one of the greatest actors never nominated for the award; In 2009, Leigh Singer of the Guardian called him "arguably the best actor never Oscar-nominated." Before winning for Darkest Hour, he also carried the label of the greatest actor never to win the Oscar. In 2018, Stuart McGurk of GQ described Oldman as "the master of being brilliant in bad movies".

In 1998, Oldman was honoured at the Camerimage Film Festival, where he was awarded the Krzysztof Kieślowski Award for Acting, the first recipient of the award. In 2011, Oldman received a Tribute Award from the Gotham Awards. In that same year, the Palm Springs International Film Festival announced that Oldman would be receiving its International Star Award, which honours "an actor or actress who has achieved both critical and commercial international recognition throughout their body of work." The PSIFF chairman called Oldman "a performer whose ability to portray the most extreme of characters is a testament to the enormity of his talent." In 2012, The Hollywood Reporter named Oldman the highest-grossing actor in history, based on lead and supporting roles. Films in which he has appeared have grossed over $4.1 billion in the United States, and over $11 billion worldwide.

In 2012, Oldman was among the British cultural icons selected by artist Sir Peter Blake to appear in a new version of his most famous artwork—the Beatles' Sgt. Pepper's Lonely Hearts Club Band album cover—to celebrate the British cultural figures of his life that he most admires to mark his 80th birthday. In 2014, he received the Dilys Powell Award For Excellence In Film by the London Film Critics.

In 2018, Oldman received the Variety Award at the British Independent Film Awards, which recognises a director, actor, writer or producer who has made a global impact and helped to focus the international spotlight on the U.K. Variety's vice president, Steven Gaydos, remarked that Oldman "has blazed a path as one of international cinema's most versatile and valued actors." In the same year, the Santa Barbara International Film Festival awarded Oldman the Maltin Modern Master Award, the highest accolade awarded by SPIFF that honors an individual who has enriched our culture through accomplishments in the motion picture industry. Leonard Maltin claimed Oldman has "once again proven that he is a force to be reckoned with, and a true master of his craft". Oldman was also awarded his first Career Achievement Award by the Hollywood Film Awards. The Make-up Artists and Hair Stylists Guild Awards as well honored him with the Distinguished Artisan Award, which IATSE President Susan Cabral-Ebert proclaimed him as "a chameleon, an actor who changes his appearance, his voice, everything about himself from film to film".

In 2019, British Airways celebrated its 100th anniversary with a television advertisement featuring key figures from British culture, including Oldman. He was described by BA as "an iconic British legend" who is "regarded as one of the greatest screen actors of his generation".

Personal life

Views and lifestyle
After establishing himself as an actor, Oldman moved to Los Angeles in the early 1990s. Despite numerous lead and supporting roles in major Hollywood films, he is protective of his private life and is known for his stance on celebrity culture and the ideals of Hollywood: "Being famous, that's a whole other career. And I haven't got any energy for it." In 2014, he described himself as a libertarian.

Oldman's alcoholism was well known during the early 1990s; he was arrested for drunk driving in 1991 and checked himself into rehab in 1994. In subsequent interviews, he acknowledged his problems with alcohol and called himself a recovering alcoholic in a 2001 interview with Charlie Rose. He now lives a teetotal lifestyle (he has been sober since 1997) and attributes his success in beating his addiction to attending meetings with Alcoholics Anonymous, which he has publicly praised.

Marriages and family
Oldman has been married five times. He wed English actress Lesley Manville in 1987, and their son, Alfie, was born the following year. Oldman broke up with Manville in 1989, three months after their son was born. She stated in 2018 that they are on good terms, saying, "[H]e's got a new wife, and we all get on... Gary and I are friends." They have two grandchildren, Matilda and Ozzy Oldman, through Alfie.

Oldman met American actress Uma Thurman on the set of State of Grace; they were married in 1990, but divorced in 1992. From 1994 to 1996, he was engaged to Italian actress and model Isabella Rossellini, his co-star in Immortal Beloved, but they never wed.

From 1997 to 2001, Oldman was married to American model Donya Fiorentino (sister of actress Linda Fiorentino), with whom he had two sons: Gulliver (born 1997) and Charlie (born 1999). Oldman was investigated and cleared of a domestic assault allegation made by Fiorentino during the pair's divorce, receiving sole legal and physical child custody; Fiorentino was granted limited, state-supervised contact dependent on her passing drug and alcohol tests. In 2003, a judge reduced her access to the children after dismissing claims that Oldman had drugged and physically abused them. In 2018, Gulliver, whom Fiorentino claimed had witnessed the alleged domestic assault, lamented the "pain and hardship" caused by his mother's "lies" over the years, while specifically condemning the media's "disgusting" perpetuation of the assault allegation.

On 31 December 2008, Oldman married English singer and actress Alexandra Edenborough in Santa Barbara, California. Edenborough filed for divorce on 9 January 2015; the divorce was finalised in September 2015. In August 2017, Oldman married writer and art curator Gisele Schmidt in a private ceremony at the home of his manager, Douglas Urbanski.

See also
 List of British Academy Award nominees and winners
 List of actors with Academy Award nominations
 List of actors with two or more Academy Award nominations in acting categories

References

External links

 
 
 
 Interview with Gary Oldman on his directorial debut – Nil by Mouth
 Wolf in Sheep's Clothing: The Strange Career of Gary Oldman

 
1958 births
Living people
20th-century English male actors
21st-century English male actors
Alumni of Rose Bruford College
Audiobook narrators
Best Actor AACTA International Award winners
Best Actor Academy Award winners
Best Actor BAFTA Award winners
Best Drama Actor Golden Globe (film) winners
Best Original Screenplay BAFTA Award winners
British expatriate male actors in the United States
English expatriates in the United States
English film directors
English libertarians
English male film actors
English male screenwriters
English male stage actors
English male television actors
English male video game actors
English male voice actors
Film directors from London
Male actors from London
Method actors
Outstanding Performance by a Male Actor in a Leading Role Screen Actors Guild Award winners
People from New Cross
Royal Shakespeare Company members